Lai Vung is a district of Đồng Tháp province, formally called Đức Thành District in Sa Đéc province in the Mekong Delta region of Vietnam. This place was dubbed the "Kingdom of Mandarin Oranges".

As of 2003 the district had a population of 160,125. The district covers an area of 220 km². The district capital lies at Lai Vung township. This district is famous for its mandarin orange which usually ripens during the Tết holiday season and for the master boat craftsmen in Long Hậu commune. Other specialities are Nem Lai Vung - a kind of fermented pork - and Phong Hòa pomelo.

Geographical location

Lai Vung is located 12.3 km WSW of Sa Đéc, 24.9 km S of Cao Lãnh, 26.5 km NNW of Cần Thơ and 29.4 km SE of Long Xuyên

Economy

Sông Hậu Industrial Park
Sông Hậu Industrial Park is located in Tân Thành commune, with a planned area of 66,336 ha, very convenient for transportation; the road is bordered by National Highway 54, the waterway is adjacent to the Hậu River and is located near other urban centers such as Cần Thơ (30 km), Long Xuyên (20 km), Cao Lãnh (30 km), Mỹ Thới port (16 km) and Cần Thơ port (20 km).

Divisions
The district is divided into 1 township and 11 communes:

Town
Capital of Lai Vung District: Lai Vung
Communes
Phong Hòa, Định Hòa, Tân Hòa, Vĩnh Thới, Long Thắng, Hòa Long, Tân Thành, Tân Phước, Long Hậu, Tân Dương and Hòa Thành

References

Districts of Đồng Tháp province